Laura Fuertes is a Spanish boxer. She participated at the 2022 IBA Women's World Boxing Championships, being awarded the bronze medal in the light flyweight division. Fuertes was the first Spanish boxer to win a World Championships medal.

She won a bronze medal in the light flyweight division at the 2022 Mediterranean Games held in Oran, Algeria.

References

External links 

Living people
Year of birth missing (living people)
Place of birth missing (living people)
Spanish women boxers
Light-flyweight boxers
AIBA Women's World Boxing Championships medalists
Competitors at the 2022 Mediterranean Games
Mediterranean Games bronze medalists for Spain
Mediterranean Games medalists in boxing
21st-century Spanish women